Sestri may refer to:

Sestri Levante, a municipality in the Province of Genoa (Italy)
Sestri Ponente, a suburb of the city of Genoa (Italy)